Chloë Grace Moretz (born February 10, 1997) is an American actress. She is the recipient of various accolades, including four MTV Movie & TV Awards, two People's Choice Awards, two Saturn Awards, and two Young Artist Awards.

She began acting as a child, with early roles in the supernatural horror film The Amityville Horror (2005), the drama series Desperate Housewives (2006–07), the supernatural horror film The Eye (2008), the drama film The Poker House (2008), the drama series Dirty Sexy Money (2007–08), the romantic comedy film 500 Days of Summer (2009) and the children's comedy film Diary of a Wimpy Kid (2010). Her breakthrough came in 2010 with her critically acclaimed performances as Hit-Girl in the superhero film Kick-Ass and as a child vampire in the horror film Let Me In.

Moretz starred in Martin Scorsese's historical adventure film Hugo (2011), Tim Burton's horror comedy film Dark Shadows (2012), the satirical sitcom 30 Rock (2011–2013), reprised her role as Hit-Girl in Kick-Ass 2 (2013) and portrayed Carrie White in the supernatural horror film Carrie (2013). In 2014, Moretz starred in the award-winning drama film Clouds of Sils Maria (2014), the teen romantic drama If I Stay (2014) and the vigilante action film The Equalizer (2014). She also starred in the mystery thriller film Dark Places (2015), the science fiction action film The 5th Wave (2016) and the comedy film Neighbors 2: Sorority Rising (2016).

In 2016, Moretz announced she was "re-assessing" her choice of roles and was dropping out of several projects, including Universal Studios' live-action adaptation of The Little Mermaid. Moretz's following roles include the drama film The Miseducation of Cameron Post (2018), Neil Jordan's drama thriller film Greta (2018), the action horror film Shadow in the Cloud (2020) and the science fiction film Mother/Android (2021). She voiced Wednesday Addams in The Addams Family (2019) and The Addams Family 2 (2021). Moretz's stage work includes her starring role in the original off-Broadway production of The Library (2014) at The Public Theater in New York City.

Early life
Moretz was born in Atlanta, Georgia, and raised in Cartersville, Georgia. Her mother, Teri Duke, is a nurse practitioner, and her father, Dr. McCoy "Mac" Moretz (1957–2021), was a plastic surgeon, and heir to the Moretz hosiery business, bought out in 2011 for $350 million. She has four older brothers: Brandon, Trevor, Colin, and Ethan; an older sister, Kathleen, died shortly after birth. She has described her family as "very Christian", specifically Southern Baptist. She moved to New York City in 2002, with her mother and brother Trevor, because he had been accepted into the Professional Performing Arts School, which is what first drew her interest in acting. Moretz would help Trevor read lines.

Career

2004–2015: Early roles and breakthrough

Moretz's first acting role was as Violet in two episodes of the CBS series The Guardian, and her first film role was as Molly in Heart of the Beholder. It was not until her second big-screen acting role, in the 2005 remake of The Amityville Horror, that she earned greater recognition, receiving a Young Artist Award nomination. After Amityville, Moretz received several guest-starring roles on TV, as well as a small role in Big Momma's House 2. Her recurring TV characters include Kiki George in Dirty Sexy Money and Sherri Maltby in Desperate Housewives. Moretz also voiced the U.S. version of the animated character Darby in My Friends Tigger & Pooh. Moretz also co-starred as Cammie, an abused child, in The Poker House.

In 2010, Moretz appeared as Hit-Girl in director Matthew Vaughn's action film Kick-Ass, based on the comic book series of the same name by Mark Millar and John Romita Jr. Moretz trained with Jackie Chan's stunt crew for three months prior to filming and did most of her own stunts while filming on location. Because of her youth, there was controversy about her role in the violent film. She received critical acclaim for her performance. Roger Ebert gave the film only one star, but wrote about Moretz: "Say what you will about her character, but Chloë Grace Moretz has presence and appeal." That same year, she played Abby, a 12-year-old vampire, in Let Me In (2010), the UK/US remake of the Swedish film Let the Right One In.

Moretz played Ann Sliger in the 2011 crime thriller Texas Killing Fields. That same year, she played Isabelle in Martin Scorsese's Hugo, a 3D film adaptation of The Invention of Hugo Cabret, which was nominated for eleven Oscars. Moretz starred in Hick, an adaptation of the novel by Andrea Portes. She appeared in the 2012 Tim Burton film Dark Shadows, a remake of the soap opera, playing the role of Carolyn Stoddard, a rebellious teenage daughter.

In 2013, she reprised her role as Hit-Girl in the sequel Kick-Ass 2. The same year, she appeared in a short segment in the film Movie 43 and played the title character in Carrie, a remake of the 1976 film, directed by Kimberly Peirce.

Moretz has done voice work for video games. She reprised her role as Hit-Girl for Kick-Ass: The Game, and played young Lady Emily in Dishonored. When asked in October 2012 why she tends to gravitate towards playing darker, troubled characters, Moretz responded that she has such a happy family life, and finds it challenging to play characters who are significantly different. From March 25 through April 27, 2014, Moretz made her Off-Broadway debut in The Library, directed by Steven Soderbergh.

Moretz played the protagonist, Mia, in the adaptation of Gayle Forman's If I Stay (2014). The story follows a 17-year-old classical musician as she deals with the aftermath of a catastrophic car accident involving her family and has an out-of-body experience. Critical response to the film was mixed; a 35% positive rating based on 122 reviews and an average rating of 5/10 garnered by Rotten Tomatoes was accompanied by a critics' consensus praising Moretz for giving the performance "her all". Moretz subsequently starred as Cassie Sullivan in The 5th Wave, an adaptation of the best-selling novel by Rick Yancey. The film was released in January 2016. Hannah Minghella of Sony Pictures said Moretz "embodies the heart, strength and determination that make Cassie such a compelling character."

2016–present: reassessment and current work
In April 2016, Moretz was chosen to serve as one of three members of the Narrative Short Film Competition jury for the Tribeca Film Festival, alongside Mike Birbiglia and Sheila Nevins. Also that year, she co-starred with Zac Efron and Seth Rogen in the film Neighbors 2: Sorority Rising, the sequel to Neighbors; and headlined the drama film Brain on Fire, based on the memoir Brain on Fire by Susannah Cahalan.

In November 2015, Moretz was attached to Shane Carruth's third film, The Modern Ocean. The ensemble cast includes Asa Butterfield, Anne Hathaway, Daniel Radcliffe and Keanu Reeves. Also in November, Moretz was announced as the star of Universal Studios' live-action version of Hans Christian Andersen's The Little Mermaid, to be written by Richard Curtis, though she later left the project.

In a 2016 interview with The Hollywood Reporter, Moretz revealed she had dropped out of all the unproduced film projects she was attached to. The only announced film this affected was The Little Mermaid, since several other films she was slated to appear in were already in post-production. She explained, "I want to reassess who I am and find myself within my roles again. I'm realizing that I can slow down." She said the workload that came from being in several films a year "was causing her to lose sight of [the reason] she started acting and instead focus on [her films' box office receipts]." She stated she would focus on producing, including two television projects. This was taken by some media outlets as Moretz taking a hiatus from acting, so in a later interview, she clarified that she was not taking time off, saying: "I'm just becoming more picky and particular about what roles I'm choosing. I think as an actor you have a huge opportunity to find yourself through the roles that you choose. I think it's my time, right now in my life, to figure out who I am and what I am and what I want and what this industry means... Why not sit back, slow down, realize I'm 19 and go, 'Hey, let's make stuff that really, really hits hard with who I am and helps me figure out what it means to be a 19-year-old actor who is just doing her thing.'"

In 2017, Moretz co-starred again with Ansel Elgort, in the crime drama November Criminals. That same year, she starred in the comedy-drama I Love You, Daddy, directed by Louis C.K. which had its world premiere at the Toronto International Film Festival, where it received negative reviews from critics. Following sexual misconduct allegations against C.K. the film's release was canceled by media company The Orchard, which had acquired U.S. distribution rights to the film as well as international distributors. In the aftermath of the scandal, Moretz stated, "I think it should just kind of go away, honestly. I don't think it's time for them to have a voice right now," referring to men accused of sexual misconduct. "Of course, it's devastating to put time into a project and have it disappear, [...] [b]ut at the same time, this [Me Too] movement is so powerful and so progressive that I'm just happy to be in communication with everyone and to see the big change in the face of the industry, which I think is very, very real."

In 2018, Moretz starred in the drama film The Miseducation of Cameron Post opposite Sasha Lane and Forrest Goodluck revolving around a teenage girl who is sent to a conversion camp. The film received positive reviews from critics, praising Moretz's performance. It had its world premiere at the Sundance Film Festival, where it won the Grand Jury Prize. The film was released on August 3, 2018, by FilmRise. She next appeared in the horror film Suspiria, a remake of the 1977 film of the same name directed by Luca Guadagnino which had its world premiere at the Venice Film Festival in September 2018. It received mixed reviews from critics, and performed poorly at the box office. She then starred opposite Isabelle Huppert in Greta, a thriller film, which had its world premiere at the Toronto International Film Festival in September 2018. It was released on March 1, 2019, by Focus Features.

In 2019, Moretz voiced Wednesday Addams in the CGI animated film The Addams Family, which received mixed reviews from critics. In 2021, she appeared in the live-action/animated film Tom & Jerry, directed by Tim Story; Shadow in the Cloud, a horror-thriller directed by Roseanne Liang, and the sequel The Addams Family 2. She signed on for a role in Mattson Tomlin's first film as director, Mother/Android, and appeared in the Amazon Prime Video series The Peripheral.

In 2021, Moretz executive produced the six-part Snapchat Original series, Coming Out. highlighting young LGBTQ people. In an interview with The Advocate, she said, "I hope it is a show that will help to save lives by sharing what coming out means to each individualthat no single 'coming out' story is the same, each one is unique."

She is set to voice the title character in the animated film Nimona, to be released on Netflix in 2023.

Fashion
Moretz has appeared in photo shoots, including editorials, features and covers, for magazines including Flaunt, Vogue, Teen Vogue, Jalouse, Marie Claire, Interview, Elle, Love, Crash Magazine, InStyle and many others. She has also been invited to various haute couture events, such as Dior Spring/Summer 2013 at Paris Fashion Week. Max Mara's signature in 2012 granted her the "Max Mara Face of the Future" award. In 2012, Moretz also became the face of American youth clothing retailer Aéropostale, appearing at various events, videos and reports. In February 2013, Elle magazine awarded her with the "Next Future Icon Award" at the Elle Style Awards gala held in London.

Personal life

Moretz resides in Studio City, Los Angeles. Her brother Brandon serves as her business manager; her brother Trevor has been her acting coach since 2010, and accompanied her on trips and press dates when her parents were unable to attend.

In December 2014, Moretz confirmed she was dating English model and photographer Brooklyn Beckham. She attended the 2016 Democratic National Convention with Beckham in support of Hillary Clinton. In August 2018, she confirmed that after dating on and off for four years, they had broken up.

Activism 
Moretz has publicly supported LGBT equality. Two of her brothers are gay; Moretz states they had initially tried to "pray the gay away" to appease their community. She identifies as a feminist and has turned down film roles that she found to be overtly sexualized. She took on the role of a teenage prostitute in the 2014 film The Equalizer because her character "felt so real", rather than a "plot device". In October 2014, Moretz was named one of the 25 Most Influential Teens of the year by Time magazine.

In 2016, Moretz voiced her support for Democratic presidential candidate Hillary Clinton on the South Korean show The Brainiacs/Problematic Men. She also appeared as a speaker at the 2016 Democratic National Convention in July 2016, praising Clinton and encouraging young people to vote.

Filmography

Film

Television

Stage

Music videos

Video games

References

External links

 
 
 

1997 births
Living people
21st-century American actresses
Actresses from Atlanta
Actresses from Georgia (U.S. state)
American child actresses
American feminists
American film actresses
American television actresses
American voice actresses
People from Studio City, Los Angeles
American LGBT rights activists